Hubert George Beaumont (6 April 1864 – 14 August 1922), styled The Honourable from 1906, was a radical British Liberal Party politician.

Background
He was the third son of Wentworth Beaumont, 1st Baron Allendale and his wife Lady Margaret Anne de Burgh, daughter of Ulick de Burgh, 1st Marquess of Clanricarde. Beaumont was educated at Eton College and then at Cheltenham College. He studied at Balliol College, Oxford, obtaining a Bachelor of Arts degree. On 26 May 1900, he married Elisa Mercedes Grace, daughter of Michael Paul Grace. She drowned on 10 August 1917. Their only son was Michael Wentworth Beaumont. He was invested as a Knight of Grace of the Most Venerable Order of the Hospital of Saint John of Jerusalem in 1918 and was appointed High Sheriff of Buckinghamshire in the next year.

Political career
He contested King's Lynn in 1895, thereafter Buckingham in 1900 and Barnard Castle three years later. Beaumont finally entered the British House of Commons in 1906, sitting for Eastbourne until January 1910 when he chose not to defend his seat. He briefly sat in the Commons at the same time as his older brother Wentworth Beaumont.
He contested the 1913 London County Council election as a Progressive candidate for Clapham

Electoral record

References

External links

1864 births
1922 deaths
Alumni of Balliol College, Oxford
British Army personnel of World War I
High Sheriffs of Buckinghamshire
Knights of Grace of the Order of St John
Liberal Party (UK) MPs for English constituencies
People educated at Cheltenham College
People educated at Eton College
UK MPs 1906–1910
Younger sons of barons